Gary Hudson (born 1949/1950) has been involved in private spaceflight development since 1970, for over 40 years.

Biography
Hudson is best known as the founder of Rotary Rocket Company, which in spending ~$30 Million attempted to build a unique single stage to orbit launch vehicle known as the Roton.  Rotary Rocket built a landing test simulator (the Roton ATV) which flew three successful test flights in 1999. The book "They All Laughed at Christopher Columbus - An Incurable Dreamer Builds the First Civilian Spaceship" by Elizabeth Weil is about the Roton project and Gary Hudson.

He also helped found Transformational Space T/Space in 2004.

He also helped found AirLaunch LLC which was awarded the DARPA/USAF FALCON project in 2003.

Previous projects included designs of the Phoenix SSTO, the Percheron, and other rockets, founder of Pacific American Launch Systems, and various consulting projects.

Currently, he is the President and CEO of the Space Studies Institute.

Hudson appears as a character in the novel Fallen Angels, along with his Phoenix SSTO.

Hudson is also a founding partner of Oisin Biotechnologies, which is developing a liposomally-delivered suicide gene senolytic therapy (a treatment that removes senescent cells from the body). Hudson provided an initial seed donation to help fund the creation of the SENS Research Foundation.

See also
 Roton SSTO
 T/space
 Ansari X Prize
 Percheron (rocket)

References

External links
 T/Space 
 Gary Hudson entry in Spacefuture Who's Who
 
  They also laughed at Christopher Columbus

American aerospace engineers
Living people
Year of birth missing (living people)
Single-stage-to-orbit